Beato may refer to:

People 
 Affonso Beato (born 1941), Brazilian cinematographer
 Antonio Beato (1835–1906), British-Italian photographer
 Felice Beato (1832–1909), British-Italian photographer
 Felice A. Beato, collective signature used by the brothers Felice Beato and Antonio Beato
 Fiordaliza Beato (born 1995), Dominican footballer
 Gerónimo Beato (born 1995), Uruguayan footballer
 Pedro Beato (born 1986), Major League Baseball player
 Rick Beato (born 1962), American musician
 Il Beato Angelico or Fra Angelico (Guido di Pietro, c.1395–1455), Italian painter

Other uses 
 Beato, an Italian epithet for a beatified person
 Beato (Lisbon), a parish (freguesia) in Portugal